The 16th Niue Assembly was a term of the Niue Assembly. Its composition was determined by the 2017 election, held on June 6, 2017.

The Speaker of the 16th Assembly is Togiavalu Pihigia.

Members
The members of the 16th Legislative Assembly are:

References

Politics of Niue
Political organisations based in Niue
2017 establishments in Niue
Sittings of the Niue Assembly